Raju Singh Mahi (born 16 September 1983) is an Indian actor. He is known for his acting in Bhojpuri cinema's blockbuster movies Sabse Bada Champion, Gadar 2 and Love Ke Liye Kuchh Bhi Karega.

Early life
Singh was born in a Singh family on born 16 September 1983. He was born and brought up in Azamgarh, Uttar Pradesh. Singh did his schooling and High School from Wesly Inter College, Azamgarh, Uttar Pradesh. He did his Graduation From DAV Degree College And Post Graduation MBA.

Singh also adds, My family always wanted me to study till my post graduation but I always had interest in fine arts 
Still I did Masters of Business Administrator MBA but I used to do stuff related to dancing, acting, writing and all apart from my studies. I used to do plays, participated in writing competitions and all and won many prizes, I did modelling during school and college days, bunked my colleges in Mumbai and go for shoots, theater etc. After finishing my college in Azamgarh I got placed in big company ( Dainik Jagran ) News Company at Varanasi.

Career

Singh started his Career as theater artist. He take training under Theater Director Bharat Manjul. Singh made his Film debut in the 2009 name Preet Na ane Bhed. Did a music video album Jindagi Jhand Ba, Phir Bhi Ghamand Ba by Raju Singh Mahi & Sonalika Prasad.

Filmography

{| class="wikitable sortable"
|-
! Year
! Film
! Role
! Language
|-
| 2009 || Preet na jane bhed || Inspector ||Bhojpuri
|-
| 2010 || Ghurahua Auto Wala ||  ||Bhojpuri
|-
| 2011 || Aulad ||  ||Bhojpuri
|-
| 2012 || Jaan Tere Liya ||  ||Bhojpuri
|-
| 2012 || Jaan kah da na ||  ||Bhojpuri
|-
| 2013 || Inteqaam ||  ||Bhojpuri
|-
| 2014 || Truck Driver 2 ||  ||Bhojpuri
|-
| 2015 || Border par sajni hamar ||  ||Bhojpuri
|-
| 2015 || Vidhayak Jee ||  ||Bhojpuri
|-
| 2016 || Gadar ||  ||Bhojpuri
|-
| 2017 || Tu Hi To Meri Jaan Hai Radha 2''' ||  ||Bhojpuri
|-
| 2017 || Pakistan me Jai Shree Ram ||  ||Bhojpuri
|-
| 2018 || Gadar 2 ||  ||Bhojpuri
|-
| 2018 || Love Ke Liye Kuchh Bhi Karega ||  ||Bhojpuri
|-
| 2018 || Maai Re Hamra Uhe Ladki Chahi ||  ||Bhojpuri
|-
| 2018 || Teen Budbak ||  ||Bhojpuri
|-
| 2019 || Sabse Bada Champion || || Bhojpuri
|-
| 2019 || Policegiri ||  ||Bhojpuri
|-
| 2019 
|scope="row" style="background:#ffc; " | Bade Miya Chhote Miya  
|
|Bhojpuri
|-
| 2020
|scope="row" style="background:#ffc; " | Gumrah  
|
|Bhojpuri
|-
| 2020
|scope="row" style="background:#ffc; " |  Om Jai Jagdish 
|
|Bhojpuri
|-
| 2021 
|scope="row" style="background:#ffc; " | Bhagwa 
|
|Bhojpuri
|-
| 2021
|scope="row" style="background:#ffc; " | Sadak 
|
|Bhojpuri
|-
| 2021
|scope="row" style="background:#ffc; " | Saiya 420 
|
|Bhojpuri
|-
| 2021 
|scope="row" style="background:#ffc; " | Saiko saiya 
|
|Bhojpuri
|-
| 2021
|scope="row" style="background:#ffc; " | Deelwale 
|
|Bhojpuri
|-
| 2021
|scope="row" style="background:#ffc; " | Stage Singer 
|
|Hindi
|}

Music videos
 Zindagi Jhand Ba Phir Bhi Ghamand Ba''

References

External links

1983 births
Living people
Indian male film actors
21st-century Indian male actors